Odiah Sidibé (born 13 January 1970 in Fréjus, Var) is a French sprint athlete of Guinean descent.

Achievements 
 2002 European Championships in Athletics – gold medal (4 × 100 m relay)
 2002 European Championships in Athletics – seventh place (100 m)
 2001 World Championships in Athletics – silver medal (4 × 100 m relay)
 1994 Jeux de la Francophonie – silver medal (100 m)

References

External links

European Championships

1970 births
Living people
Sportspeople from Fréjus
French sportspeople of Guinean descent
French female sprinters
Athletes (track and field) at the 1992 Summer Olympics
Athletes (track and field) at the 1996 Summer Olympics
Olympic athletes of France
World Athletics Championships medalists
European Athletics Championships medalists
Mediterranean Games gold medalists for France
Mediterranean Games medalists in athletics
Athletes (track and field) at the 1993 Mediterranean Games
Olympic female sprinters
Black French sportspeople